Lo Último que Hable Ayer is the fourth studio album by the rock band Libido, following the departure of original drummer Jeffry Fischman, who is replaced by Ivan Mindreau.

Track listing 

2005 albums
Líbido (band) albums